Knauss is a German surname, known from at least 1515. The earliest people recorded with this name appear to be from southern Germany. The meaning is very unclear but may mean "haughty person." Other suggested sources have included a sharp strike (hit), a beard, the crust of a loaf of bread, or a small hill. Known descendant variants of the name include Knaus, Knauß, Knous, Knause, Knouse, Kanouse, Kenouse, and Canouse. Other variants believed to have been used at one time include Knouss and Knows. It is possible that variant names without the initial "K" are descended from this line, but no evidence to this has been discovered yet.

A Slovene variant of that German name Knauss is Knaus and Knau´vs . Melania Trump germanised her name from "Melanija Knavs" to "Melania Knauss" as part of her modeling career.

List of people with the surname Knauss
 Donald Knauss, former CEO of Clorox
 Greg Knauss, internet humorist and computer programmer
 John A. Knauss, oceanographer
 Melania Knauss Trump, businesswoman and First Lady of the United States
 Sarah Knauss (1880–1999), supercentenarian
 Sibylle Knauss, author and professor

List of people with the surname Knaus
 Chad Knaus (born 1971), NASCAR crew chief
 Eric Knaus (born 1970), children's entertainer known as "The Great Zucchini"
 Hermann Knaus
 Ludwig Knaus (1829–1910), painter
 Michael Knaus, Paralympic skier

List of people with the surname Knauß
 Bernhard Knauß (born 1965), Austrian-Slovenian alpine skier
 Hans Knauß (born 1971), Austrian alpine skier

Other spellings
 Bessie B. Kanouse (1889-1969), American mycologist
 William Lee Knous (1889–1959), Colorado governor
 Robert Lee Knous (1917–2000), Colorado lieutenant governor